Ðula Sabo was a Yugoslavian wrestler who competed at the 1928 Summer Olympics.

References

External links
 

Year of birth missing
Possibly living people
Olympic wrestlers of Yugoslavia
Wrestlers at the 1928 Summer Olympics
Yugoslav male sport wrestlers